Allerton Golf Club House is a ruined Neoclassical building located in Allerton, Liverpool, England. Completed in 1815 by the architect Harrison of Chester for the owner Jacob Fletcher, the building was built on the site of a previous one which had been destroyed by a fire. This replacement building was occupied by the Fletcher family for 104 years before being purchased in 1923 by the Liverpool Corporation, who converted the mansion into a clubhouse for a newly built golf course. On 21 November 1944 another fire broke out, leaving the building in ruins. On 14 March 1975 the ruins became a Grade II listed structure.

To the south-east of the house is a sandstone obelisk which belonged to the original 18th century house. It is of square plan, and is mounted on plinth. The obelisk is Grade II listed.

See also
 Listed buildings in the United Kingdom
 Grade II listed buildings in Liverpool-L25

References

External links
 Allerton Golf Club Website

Neoclassical architecture in Liverpool
Unused buildings in Liverpool
Grade II listed buildings in Liverpool
1815 establishments in England